Barun Mukherjee is an Indian cinematographer who works primarily in Hindi Cinema.

Filmography

References

External links

Hindi film cinematographers
Bengali people
Film and Television Institute of India alumni
Year of birth missing (living people)
Living people